Hygrotus versicolor is a species of Dytiscidae native to Europe.

References

Hygrotus
Beetles described in 1783
Beetles of Europe